The 1995 Belgian Grand Prix was a Formula One motor race held on 27 August 1995 at the Circuit de Spa-Francorchamps, near the village of Francorchamps, Wallonia. It was the eleventh race of the 1995 Formula One World Championship.

The 44-lap race was won by Michael Schumacher, driving a Benetton-Renault. Despite qualifying only 16th, Schumacher took his sixth victory of the season after an intense battle with Damon Hill in the Williams-Renault. Hill settled for second, with Martin Brundle third in a Ligier-Mugen-Honda, which would be his last podium finish.

Race report
The race was attended by in excess of 100,000 people. Schumacher and Hill both qualified further down the grid than usual in a wet-dry qualifying session, but fought back during the race. Both Jean Alesi and Johnny Herbert briefly led the race, but Alesi broke down and Herbert struggled for pace once the track was dry. Polesitter Gerhard Berger struggled before dropping out.

David Coulthard pulled away at the front for Williams before suffering a gearbox problem, leaving Hill to lead the race. When Hill made his first pit stop for fresh slick tyres, Schumacher took over at the head of the field. It then started to rain and while Hill went back to the pits for wet weather tyres, Schumacher stayed out on his dry weather slicks. The Williams driver rapidly caught up with the German, but despite lapping six seconds a lap slower, Schumacher was able to keep Hill behind him until he went off the wet track and Hill passed him. Almost immediately the changing track conditions began to favour slicks once more and Schumacher re-passed Hill who pitted again, this time for slicks.

The rain intensified again and the field levelled out when the safety car appeared. Both drivers pitted for wets and returned to the track with Schumacher narrowly ahead of Hill. This appeared to set the two title rivals up for a battle for the lead going into the last ten laps, but Hill then had to pit again to serve a ten-second stop-go penalty for pit lane speeding, a penalty he served with six laps to go, and which put him down to third. Hill recovered to pass Martin Brundle on the Kemmel straight on the final lap to regain second place.

Schumacher's performance did not impress Hill after his defensive moves forced Hill to either back off or go off the track. Schumacher claimed that he had only blocked Hill at the low-speed corners, but video evidence suggested that Schumacher had blocked Hill on some of the high speed corners, such as the Radillion and Blanchimont. Hill later commented that "We (he and Schumacher) had some pretty hairy moments and I am not satisfied with being driven into; I don't think that was acceptable. That is all well and good but if it was meant on purpose I would be very upset, F1 cars are not go-karts. I think there are some things which are acceptable and some things which are not." Schumacher defended himself by agreeing that touching wheels in high-speed corners is "not acceptable" but added that at the speed he and Hill were doing, he thought it was acceptable. Schumacher was given a one-race suspended ban for driving aggressively in order to stop Hill from passing.

Classification

Qualifying

Race

Championship standings after the race

Drivers' Championship standings

Constructors' Championship standings

References 

Belgian Grand Prix
Belgian Grand Prix
Belgian Grand Prix
Belgian Grand Prix